Antonia Santiago Amador (born 24 December 1946, better known as La Chana) is a Catalan gypsy dancer.

Born in Barcelona in 1946, Amador Santiago is best known as a flamenco dancer with the stage name of La Chana, inherited from her uncle, the guitarist El Chano.  She had two significant periods in her professional career, between 1966 and 1979 and again between 1985 and 1991. She married Felix Comas.

References

External links

Dancing with Closed Eyes

1946 births
Living people
People from Barcelona
Spanish female dancers
Flamenco dancers